

Franz Griesbach (21 December 1892 – 24 September 1984) was a German general during World War II. He was a recipient of the Knight's Cross of the Iron Cross with Oak Leaves and Swords of Nazi Germany.

Awards
 Iron Cross (1914) 2nd Class (22 December 1914) & 1st Class (23 August 1917)
 Clasp to the Iron Cross (1939) 2nd Class (22 October 1941) & 1st Class (22 November 1941)
 Knight's Cross of the Iron Cross with Oak Leaves and Swords
 Knight's Cross on 14 March 1942 as Major and commander of the I./Infanterie-Regiment 391
 Oak Leaves on 17 May 1943 as Oberst and commander of the Grenadier-Regiment 399
 Swords 6 March 1944 as Oberst and commander of the Grenadier-Regiment 399

References

Citations

Bibliography

External links
Franz Griesbach @ Universität Magdeburg

1892 births
1984 deaths
People from Potsdam-Mittelmark
People from the Province of Brandenburg
Major generals of the German Army (Wehrmacht)
German Army personnel of World War I
Prussian Army personnel
Recipients of the clasp to the Iron Cross, 1st class
Recipients of the Knight's Cross of the Iron Cross with Oak Leaves and Swords
German prisoners of war in World War II held by the Soviet Union